Oskar Vogt  (6 April 1870, in Husum – 30 July 1959, in Freiburg im Breisgau) was a German physician and neurologist. He and his wife Cécile Vogt-Mugnier are known for their extensive cytoarchetectonic studies on the brain.

Personal life
He was born in Husum, Schleswig-Holstein, Germany. Vogt studied medicine at Kiel and Jena, obtaining his doctorate from Jena in 1894.

The Vogts met in 1897 in Paris, and eventually married in 1899. The Vogts were close to the Krupp family. Friedrich Alfred Krupp financially supported them, and in 1898, Oskar and Cécile founded a private research institute called the Neurologische Zentralstation (Neurological Center) in Berlin, which was formally associated with the Physiological Institute of the Charité as the Neurobiological Laboratory of the Berlin University in 1902. This institute served as the basis for the 1914 formation of the Kaiser Institut für Hirnforschung (Kaiser Wilhelm Institute for Brain Research), of which Oskar was a director. There, he had students from many countries who went on to prominent careers including Jerzy Rose (mentor of Michael Merzenich),  Valentino Braitenberg (mentor of Christof Koch), Korbinian Brodmann, Rafael Lorente de Nó and Harald Brockhaus. This institute gave rise to the Max Planck Institute for Brain Research in 1945.

As a clinician, Vogt used hypnotism (Stuckrade-Barre and Danek 2004) until 1903 and wrote papers on the topic. In particular, Vogt had an intense interest for localizing the origins of "genius" or traits in the brain.

Family
Vogt married the French neurologist Cécile Vogt-Mugnier. They met in Paris in 1897 while he was there working with Joseph Jules Dejerine and his wife, Augusta Marie Dejerine-Klumke, who collaborated with him. Because of their similar scholarly interests, the Vogts collaborated for a long period, usually with Cécile as the primary author.

The Vogts had two daughters, both accomplished scientists in their own right:
 Marthe Vogt (1903–2003) was a neuropharmacologist who became a Fellow of the Royal Society and a professor at Cambridge.
 Marguerite Vogt (1913–2007) started as a developmental geneticist working in Drosophila, then moved to the US in 1950. She developed methods to culture poliovirus with Renato Dulbecco. She was a faculty member at The Salk Institute for Biological Studies where she worked on viral transformation and cellular immortalization of cancer cells.

Politics
Vogt was a socialist, involved with the factions led by Mme Fessard who knew him personally, and with the guesdist element of the French socialist party (Jules Guesde was at the far left wing of this party). He was never a Communist, although he did interact with the Soviets on a number of occasions. They sent him several researchers, including N. V. Timofeev-Resovskij (whom Solzhenitsyn met in the Gulag). He helped to establish the brain institute in Moscow.

Vogt was opposed to the Nazi Party. Gustav Krupp von Bohlen und Halbach helped fund a small hospital in Schwarzwald near Neustadt when Vogt was dismissed in 1936 from his position with the Kaiser Wilhelm Brain Research Institute.

Institutes and journals
Vogt was the editor of the prominent Journal für Psychologie und Neurologie published in German, French and English which made many of the most important contributions between the two World Wars. This later became The Journal für Hirnforschung.

Lenin's brain

Vogt had a longstanding interest in localizing functions in the brain.

In 1924, Vogt was one of the neurologists asked to consult on Lenin’s illness and was given his brain for histological study after Lenin's death. He found that Lenin's brain showed a great number of "giant cells", which Vogt saw as a sign of superior mental function. "The giant cells" were cortical pyramidal cells of unusual size. There were also particularities in layer 3.

In 1925 Vogt accepted an invitation to Moscow where he was assigned the establishment of an institute for brain research under the auspices of the health ministry in Moscow. Vogt got one slice of the 30,953 slices of 20 micrometer thick of the brain, and took it home to Berlin for research purposes. Therefore, contrary to claims of two Belgian neurologists, L. Van Bogaert and A. Dewulf, the Soviets did not have to carry out a military operation specifically to retrieve the brain before the Americans obtained it. It was, for a time, put on display in the Lenin Mausoleum. The brain is still in the Moscow's Institute.

Contributions

The contributions of the Vogts are of the first order as their work applies to several parts of the brain and had a considerable influence on international neurological sciences.

Cortex
An interest in the correlation between anatomy and psychology drew the Vogts to study the cortex. The Vogts imposed the distinction between iso- and allocortex. Based on their cytoarchitectonic studies, they promoted a six-layer pattern (there were 5 for Meynert and 7 for Cajal).

Thalamus
Oskar made several presentations of his view of the thalamus in Paris. Oskar and Cécile further referred to the work of Constantin von Monakow in a series on the anatomy of mammals. This was not a seminal work.

The main contribution of the Vogts was La myelocytoarchitecture du thalamus du cercopithèque from Cécile alone (1909). The great contribution of Cécile has been that the partition of the lateral region (lateral mass) should rely on the territories (the spaces occupied) of the main afferents. She distinguished from back to front the lemnical radiation and a particular nucleus, in front of it the cerebellar (prelemniscal) radiation with another nucleus and more anteriorly the "lenticular" radiation. This system still describes the subdivision of the thalamus (Percheron, 1977, Percheron et al. 1996). Her paper was followed by Die cytoarchitechtonik des Zwishenhirns de Cercothipiteken from Friedmann (1911) traducing in cytoarchitectonic terms, her partition.

A paper published in common in 1941 (Thalamus studien I to III), devoted to the human thalamus, represented an important step in partitioning and naming thalamic parts. The anatomy of the thalamus from Hassler (one of their students) was published in 1959, the year of the death of Oskar. It is not known whether the master accepted the excessive partition and unnecessary complication of this work; it was an atlas dedicated to stereotacticans. The paper of 1941 was much simpler.

Basal ganglia
The Vogts greatly contributed to the analysis of what is known today as the basal ganglia system. Their main interest was on the striatum, that after Foix and Nicolesco they proposed (1941) to name so. This was including the caudate nucleus, the putamen and the fundus.

Eponym
The Vogt-Vogt syndrome is an extrapyramidal disturbance with double sided athetosis occurring in early childhood.

Gallery

Awards
 1950 — National Award GRD

References

 
Schiffer, Davide, "Il Prof Vogt e i suoi celebri studi sul cervello di Lenin" (https://www.policlinicodimonza.it/prof-vogt-i-suoi-celebri-studi-sul-cervello-lenin) 
Spengler, Tilman (1991), Lenins Hirn, Reinbek, Rowohlt. Translated as Lenin's Brain, Farrar, Straus, Giroux books, 1993 (Romanticized history).
Stukrade-Barre, S and Danek, A. (2004), "Oskar Vogt (1870–1959), hypnotist and brain researcher, husband of Cecile (1875–1962)", in: Nerven arzt 75, pp. 1038–1041 (in German)
Horst-Peter Wolff (2009), Cécile und Oskar Vogt. Eine illustrierte Biographie Fürstenberg / Havel 2009 [Klagenfurter Beiträge zur Technikdiskussion, Heft 128] (https://ubdocs.aau.at/open/voll/tewi/AC08125853.pdf)

External links
 
 Biography

1870 births
1959 deaths
People from Husum
German neurologists
Members of the German Academy of Sciences at Berlin
German expatriates in the Soviet Union
Max Planck Institute directors